Mount Bate is a mountain on Vancouver Island in Strathcona Regional District, British Columbia, Canada,  east of the community of Tahsis and  southwest of Rugged Mountain.  Mount Bate is thought to have been named by George Henry Richards for Captain William Thornton Bate, RN, a surveyor who was killed in the capture of Canton during the Second Opium War in 1857. The mountain is at the head of Canton Gorge, another geographical feature named by Richards.

References

Bate, Mount
One-thousanders of British Columbia
Nootka Land District